Joe Frank (August 19, 1938 – January 15, 2018) was a French-born American writer, teacher, and radio performer best known for his often philosophical, humorous, surrealist, and sometimes absurd monologues and radio dramas he recorded often in collaboration with friends, actors, and family members.

Early life
Frank was born Joseph Langermann in Strasbourg, France, near the border of Germany, to father Meier Langermann (then aged 51, a Polish-born shoe manufacturer) and mother Friederike "Fritzi" Langermann (née Passweg) (then aged 26). Frank was born months before the family fled from Nazi Germany's persecution of Jewish people in their native Poland. Legislation to allow the family and others into the country was passed by the US Congress twice, the first having been vetoed by President Roosevelt. 

Joe grew up in one of the twin towers of The El Dorado in Central Park West. After helping many of his mother's relatives escape Nazis, Meier also housed them in one of The El Dorado's apartments. In 1950, Joe and his family moved to Great Neck, Long Island where he attended high school.

His father (identified as 'Meyer Langerman' in New York City's death records) died of kidney failure on October 8, 1943, when Joe was five years old. On April 28, 1945, his mother married Theodore Frank (whom Joe called Freddy in his show, and in the article 'Joe Frank is off the air' in the 'LA Weekly' in 1997) and changed Joe's last name.

In his twenties, Frank studied at Hofstra University in New York and later at the Iowa Writers' Workshop. In 1964, he taught five grades of English at the Sands Point Academy for Gifted Children in Sands Point, NY. From 1965 to 1975, Joe taught English and Russian literature and philosophy at the Dalton School in Manhattan and later, while working as a music promoter (1976-1977), became interested in the power of radio.

NPR, 1978-1984
In 1977, Frank started volunteering at Pacifica Network station WBAI in New York, performing experimental radio involving monologues, improvisational actors, and live music during late-night, free-form hours. In 1978, he moved to Washington, D.C., to serve as a co-anchor for the weekend edition of National Public Radio's All Things Considered, his first paying radio job, which lasted two weeks. At the end of each segment, he was given five minutes to create and narrate his creative fictional essays.

In 1978–1984, Joe performed in, and produced 18 dramas for the "NPR Playhouse," which won several awards.

KCRW, 1986–2018
In 1986, on the invitation of Ruth Hirschman Seymour, the general manager of NPR's Santa Monica, California, affiliate KCRW, Frank moved to Santa Monica, where he wrote, produced, and performed in his own weekly hour-long radio program, "Joe Frank: Work In Progress."

While at KCRW, Frank received several accolades.

Joe Frank continued to work at KCRW until 2002, and his work evolved, as evidenced by the diverse series he produced. The first was "Work in Progress," then "In The Dark," followed by "Somewhere out There", and finally "The Other Side."

Beginning in 2004, Frank began creating full-length shows for subscribers to his web site.

In 2012, Frank started producing periodic half-hour shows for KCRW's "UnFictional" series. He continued to produce all-new shows for the series until months before his death.

Other activities and personal life
Starting in 2003, Frank performed on stage with original material at South Coast Repertory in Costa Mesa, CA, the Art Institute of Chicago and the Steppenwolf Theatre in Chicago, Illinois; at the Great American Music Hall in San Francisco; and in Los Angeles at the Hammer Museum and Largo at the Coronet, as well as other venues.

His 230-hour body of work continues to be re-aired on WNYC New York, and many NPR stations including the radio station at the University of California at Davis, KDVS, Savannah, Georgia WRUU, Cabool, Missouri KZGM, Carson City, Nevada KNVC, Cape May, New Jersey WCFA, and others with new stations being added.

In early 2005, Frank suffered complete kidney failure. He received a second cousin's kidney in 2006, which continued to function normally (with the help of multiple immunosuppressant drugs) until his death.

In 2012, Frank returned to KCRW for episodes of the station's "UnFictional" program.

In May 2014, Frank had surgery to treat colon cancer, which was successful. In December 2015, Frank was hospitalized due to a gastrointestinal perforation following a routine medical procedure. This led to heart and kidney issues and Frank's complete recovery took a full year. His colon cancer returned in July 2017; he had surgery in October 2017 to excise a tumor in his colon. He died on January 15, 2018, after multiple reversals following the surgery, from sepsis.

Radio program style
Frank's radio programs are often dark and ironic and employ a dry sense of humor and the sincere delivery of ideas or stories that are patently absurd. Subject matter often includes religion, life's meaning, death, and Frank's relationships with women.

Frank's voice is distinctive, resonant, authoritative, and, because of his occasional voice-over work, often oddly familiar. At the 2003 Third Coast Festival, he explained that he was recording in Dolby and playing back without it, which created Joe's now familiar intimate and gritty sound. A 1987 Los Angeles Times article described it as a voice "like dirty honey" and "rich as chocolate."

The repetitive cadence of the music, drones and Frank's dry, announcer-like delivery are sometimes mixed with recorded phone calls with actor/friends such as Larry Block, Debi Mae West and Arthur Miller (not the playwright), broken into segments over the course of each hour-long program.

Frank's series "The Other Side" included excerpts from Buddhist teacher Jack Kornfield's Dharma talks at Spirit Rock Meditation Center. In an interview on KPFA's "Morning Show," Kornfield was asked about working with Joe Frank. Kornfield explained that, although he had never met or talked to Joe Frank or heard his show, he didn't mind Frank using the lectures and that many of his meditation students had found Kornfield through the show.

Other work
 Joe Frank is credited in the titles of the 1999 cult movie Galaxy Quest as the voice of the on board computer of spaceship The Protector.
  He can be heard on the song "Montok Point" on William Orbit's album Strange Cargo Hinterland.
  He can be heard on the song "Ocean" on Brazzaville's album 2002.
 The Decline of Spengler stage play, New Directions 48, New York City
 A Tour of the City stage play (Tanam Press, New York City), produced by Theatre Anima at Hangar #9 in the Old Port, Montreal, Canada, in 1990, directed by Jordan Deitcher.
 The Queen of Puerto Rico and Other Stories. (William Morrow, New York City, 1993). A collection of short stories: Tell me what to do—Fat man—Night—Date—Walter—The queen of Puerto Rico—The decline of Spengler.   Out of print.
 Four short films for television based on his radio shows were written by Joe Frank, directed by Paul Rachman and produced by Propaganda Films in Los Angeles. "Memories by Joe Frank" in 1992 for CBS Television as a pilot, "The Hitchhiker", "The Perfect Woman", and "Jilted Lover" in 1993 for the series "Inside Out" on a cable network.
 Filmmaker Chel White created three short films based on segments from Joe Frank's radio shows, two of which include his voice. The films are Dirt (1998) and "Magda"  (2004) from Frank's show "The Dictator", and "Soulmate" (2000) from "Emerald Isle".
 Short film: “Coma” produced and directed by Todd Downing. Based on the radio show of the same title by Joe Frank.
 Joe Frank: Ascent (Fantagraphics Underground, Seattle, WA, released in 2021). A comic book adaptation of six short stories, illustrated by Jason Novak in collaboration with Joe Frank before he passed.

Documentary film
A feature-length film, Joe Frank: Somewhere Out There, about Frank's life and work, was released in 2018. The film was completed prior to Frank's death and includes interviews with collaborators and other personalities.

Influence and legacy
Frank's body of work has inspired a variety of other artists including:

 Ira Glass of radio's "This American Life" worked under Frank as one of his first jobs in public radio, and credits Frank as his greatest inspiration.
 Jad Abumrad a recipient of the MacArthur fellowship most known for being the co-host and producer of WNYC's "Radiolab".
 David Sedaris, writer
 Troy Schulze, a theater artist in Houston, Texas, who created the show "Jerry's World" (2003) for Houston-based theater group Infernal Bridegroom Productions. Utilizing material from several Frank shows, the piece was deemed Best Original Show in Houston in 2011 by the Houston Press.
 Jeff Crouse, artist and technologist, created "Interactive Frank," which uses content from the Web to dynamically create a Joe Frank Show. "The user types in a sentence, and Interactive Frank takes over, scouring the Web for another sentence that follows a sentence with the last three words. Frank can also find streaming audio to accompany the generated narrative based on a word analysis, and it can read the narrative using an online text-to-speech generator."
 Filmmakers such as Francis Ford Coppola, Michael Mann, David Fincher, Ivan Reitman, and Martin Scorsese have optioned or bought stories from Joe Frank's radio shows (although the terms for Scorsese's film After Hours were settled after production had already begun).
 Blue Jam, a late-1990s series made by British comedian Chris Morris broadcast on BBC Radio 1 in the UK, shares parallels with early editions of mid-1980s Work in Progress shows.
 Comedian Dana Gould credits Joe Frank as the inspiration for the format of his podcast, The Dana Gould Hour. After Frank's death he dedicated an episode of the podcast entirely to his work and legacy.
 Jonathan Goldstein, former host of CBC radio's WireTap

Voice-over and acting work
Joe Frank performed voice-overs for commercials including Zima, the Saturn Corporation and Jiffy Lube. He was the voice of the computer in Galaxy Quest and provided voiceovers for:
 Wild Rescues on Animal Planet
 Sexy Beast as the narrator on the trailer, which was nominated for best film trailer voice over in 2002
 W/ Bob & David as the narrator in episodes 1 and 3
He also had a small acting role in The Game.

Awards
 2003
 Third Coast International Audio Festival Lifetime Achievement Award

During NPR Playhouse
 1982
 Broadcast Media Award
 1983
 Radio Program Award from the Corporation For Public Broadcasting
 Gold Award from the International Radio Festival of New York
 1984
 Gold Award from the International Radio Festival of New York (second)
 American Nomination to the Prix Italia
 1985
 Special Commendation from the Berlin Prix Futura

During Work In Progress
 1988
 Major Armstrong Award
 Corporation For Public Broadcasting Program Award
 1991
 Peabody Award
 1993
 Guggenheim Fellowship for Radio Art

References

Further reading

Tributes
After his death, there was an outpouring among radio producers especially:
a Radio Lab tribute
an All Things Considered tribute
and another from Fresh Air

External links
 – official site

Joe Frank – WFMU FAQs
Joe Frank wiki
Public Radio's Bad Dream – salon.com feature on Frank
Joe Frank article in The Guardian
Joe Frank 2016 Medical & Recovery Fund
Deus Ex videogame voice work

1938 births
2018 deaths
American radio personalities
American people of Polish-Jewish descent
French emigrants to the United States
Hofstra University alumni
American male voice actors
Iowa Writers' Workshop alumni
NPR personalities
Peabody Award winners
Jewish emigrants from Nazi Germany to the United States